"No Hay Nadie Como Tú" is the first single by alternative-rap band Calle 13 taken from their third studio album Los de Atrás Vienen Conmigo, released on October 7, 2008 by Sony BMG. It features Mexican alternative rock group Café Tacuba. The single, a list song, is known for its mixture of different musical styles, typical of Calle 13's music. It's a blend of latin pop with rock and dance music. The song won the 2009 Latin Grammys for Record of the Year & Best Alternative Song.

Music video

The video for "No Hay Nadie Como Tú" features Residente narrating a series of images, corresponding with what he's describing in song, from types of people to types of destruction. To date the video has received over 80 million views on the popular website YouTube.

Chart performance
"No Hay Nadie Como Tú" entered on the Billboard Hot Latin Songs chart at #23, making it the most successful single from the album. The single was also a success on the Billboard "Latin Rhythm Airplay" chart, charting at #15.

Charts

Certifications

References

2008 songs
Calle 13 (band) songs
Latin Grammy Award for Record of the Year
Latin Grammy Award for Best Alternative Song
Sony BMG Norte singles
Café Tacuba songs
Songs written by Residente